Patrick Joseph Lawrence (born 2 October 1942, Roseau, Dominica) is a former English first-class cricketer who represented Middlesex as a right-arm fast-medium bowler in four first-class matches during the 1964 season.

References

1942 births
English cricketers
Middlesex cricketers
Living people